Iolaus sudanicus, the Sudanian sapphire, is a butterfly in the family Lycaenidae. It is found in Senegal, Burkina Faso, northern Nigeria, Niger, Chad, southern Sudan and Ethiopia. The habitat consists of Sudan savanna and the Sahel.

The larvae feed on Loranthus species.

References

Butterflies described in 1905
Iolaus (butterfly)